Wanchai Suvaree (1931 – 1998) was a Thai footballer. He competed in the men's tournament at the 1956 Summer Olympics.

References

External links
 

1931 births
1998 deaths
Wanchai Suvaree
Wanchai Suvaree
Wanchai Suvaree
Footballers at the 1956 Summer Olympics
Place of birth missing
Association football defenders
Competitors at the 1959 Southeast Asian Peninsular Games
Wanchai Suvaree
Southeast Asian Games medalists in football